Ghasem Gerami; is an Iranian football midfielder who currently plays for Sardar Bukan in the Iranian League 2.

Club career

Early years
Gerami started his career with Padideh Sari. He spent a few seasons with Shahin Tehran, Steel Azin and Persepolis Academies. In summer 2013 he joined Khoneh Be Khoneh and helped them in promoting to 2014–15 Iran Football's 2nd Division.

Saba Qom
He joined Saba Qom on June 2, 2014 with a 3-year contract. He made his debut against Persepolis on August 30, 2014 as a substitute for Ahmad Hassanzadeh.

Club career statistics

References

External links
 Ghasem Gerami at IranLeague.ir

Living people
Iranian footballers
Saba players
1992 births
Sportspeople from Sari, Iran
Association football midfielders